Shelagh Jane Legrave  is a British education administrator.

Early life 
Legrave studied history and theology at Durham University.

Legrave is a qualified accountant.

Education administration

Chichester College 
Legrave joined Chichester College as Chief Financial Officer in 2003, and became the principal in 2010.

During her tenure at Chichester College, Legrave oversaw a merger with Crawley College in 2017, and Worthing College in 2019.

Legrave was appointed an Officer of the Order of the British Empire (OBE) in the 2015 Birthday Honours.

Legrave participated in meetings on technical education practices in the United Kingdom, that led to the creation of the T-level.

FE Commissioner 
On 1 April 2021, the Secretary of State for Education, Gavin Williamson, announced Legrave would be the next Further Education Commissioner at the Department for Education, succeeding Sir Richard Atkins in October 2021.

In the 2021 Birthday Honours, Legrave was promoted to Commander of the Order of the British Empire (CBE).

References 

Year of birth missing (living people)
Living people
British educators
Commanders of the Order of the British Empire
Alumni of Durham University